R-29 Vysota Р-29 Высота (height, altitude) is a family of Soviet submarine-launched ballistic missiles, designed by Makeyev Rocket Design Bureau.
All variants use astro-inertial guidance systems.

Variants

R-29
Deployment date: 1974
Manufacturer designation: 4K75
DoD designation: SS-N-8 Mod 1
ASCC designation: "Sawfly"
SALT designation: RSM-40
Submarine: Delta I and Delta II
Total Mass: 32,800 kg
Core Diameter: 1.80 m
Total Length: 13.20 m
Span: 1.80 m
Payload: 1100 kg
Maximum range: 7,700 km (4,784 miles)
Number of Standard Warheads: 1
Number of stages: 2

R-29R

Deployment date: 1978 
Manufacturer designation: 4K75R
DoD designation: SS-N-18 Mod 1
ASCC designation: "Stingray"
SALT designation: RSM-50
Submarine: Delta III
Total Mass: 35,300 kg
Core Diameter: 1.80 m
Total Length: 14.40 m
Span: 1.80 m
Payload: 1650 kg
Maximum range: 6,500 km (4,038 miles)
Number of Standard Warheads: 3 (500 kt) 
Number of stages: 2

R-29RK

Manufacturer designation: 4K75RK
DoD designation: SS-N-18 Mod 2
ASCC designation: "Stingray"
SALT designation: RSM-50
Submarine: Delta III
Total Mass: 34,388 kg
Core Diameter: 1.80 m
Total Length: 14.40 m
Span: 1.80 m
Maximum range: 6,500 km (4,038 miles)
Number of Standard Warheads: 7 (100 kt)
Number of stages: 2

R-29RL

Manufacturer designation: 4K75RL
DoD designation: SS-N-18 Mod 3
ASCC designation: "Stingray"
SALT designation: RSM-50
Submarine: Delta III
Total Mass: 35,300 kg
Core Diameter: 1.80 m
Total Length: 14.09 m
Span: 1.80 m
Maximum range: 9,000 km (5,592 miles)
Number of Standard Warheads: 1 (450 kt)
Number of stages: 2

R-29RM

R-29RMU

R-29RMU2

Operators
 
 The Russian Navy is the only operator of the R-29 missile family. Modernized and active variants are the R-29R, R-29RMU Sineva and R-29RMU2 Layner. As of 2019, 80 R-29RMU/RMU2 and 16 R-29R missiles were deployed on the  ballistic missile submarines:

Former operators
 
 Soviet Navy

See also
 RSM-56 Bulava
 Kanyon
 UGM-133 Trident II
 M45 (missile)
 M51 (missile)
 JL-1
 JL-2
 K Missile family
 Pukkuksong-1
 R-39 Rif
 R-39M

References

External links 
CSIS Missile Threat - SS-N-18
FAS guide on the R-29R
FAS guide on the R-29RM
State Rocket Company Makayev

Cold War submarine-launched ballistic missiles of the Soviet Union
Submarine-launched ballistic missiles of Russia
Makeyev Rocket Design Bureau
MIRV capable missiles
Military equipment introduced in the 1970s